1946 in the Philippines details events of note that happened in the Philippines in 1946.

Incumbents

 President:
Sergio Osmeña (Nacionalista Party) (until May 28)
Manuel Roxas (Liberal) (starting May 28)
 Vice President:
vacant (until May 28)
Elpidio Quirino (Liberal) (starting May 28)
 Chief Justice: Manuel Moran
 Congress: 1st (starting May 25)

Events

January
 January 2 – Walter Hutchinson, special assistant to U.S. Attorney General Thomas Clark, arrives in Manila to deal with his Filipino counterparts on one of the most complex problems in postwar history – collaboration with the Japanese during the war.
 January 5 – Lieutenant Colonel Seicho Ohta, Commander of the Military Police in Manila during the war, is sentenced to death by hanging, as per order from the Fil-American War Crimes Commission.
 January 7 – Reuters reported that the Philippines ordered goods worth ₱1,000,000 a day from the United States. Imports skyrocketed, including textiles, food, and building materials.
 January 11 – For the first time since the creation of the People's Court, a person accused of treason, Felix Española, a 66-year-old Makapili from Bulacan, voluntarily pleaded guilty.
 January 19 – The Liberal wing of the Nacionalista Party holds its convention at the Sta. Ana Cabaret and nominates Manuel Roxas and Elpidio Quirino for president and vice president, respectively.
 January 21 – The Loyalist wing of the Nacionalista Party holds its convention at the Ciro Club, Santa Mesa, Manila, and nominates Sergio Osmeña for president and Eulogio Rodriguez for vice president.
 January 22 – The report of High Commissioner Paul McNutt to President Harry Truman, which lumps the candidates into 'loyalists' and 'enemy collaborators,' created resentment among congressional leaders.
 January 31 – Malacañang announced that President Sergio Osmeña will not campaign. While Roxas tours the country, campaigning, promising, threatening, and cajoling, Osmeña tended to his duties, and placed his faith in the memory and gratitude of his countrymen.

February
 February 23 – Tomoyuki Yamashita was hanged at Los Baños, Laguna Prison Camp.

April
 April 23 – Manuel Roxas is elected as the first President of the Third Republic of the Philippines in the presidential elections, as well as the last President (equivalent to Governor) of the Commonwealth of the Philippines, defeating incumbent Sergio Osmeña in advance of scheduled independence.
 April 28 – The University of Batangas was founded in the Philippines.

June
 June 30 – The dissolution of the mainly general headquarters and military camp base of the Philippine Commonwealth Army and Philippine Constabulary are station's located in the City of Manila and around the provinces of the archipelago was aftermath of the Second World War under the Japanese Occupation was completed and defeating Imperial Japanese troops due to war.

July
 July 4 – After 377 years of colonial rule under the Spanish (1521-1898), then later the Americans for 47 years (1899-1946), the Philippines attains full independence.

September
 September 7 – The province of Tayabas changes its name to Quezon under Republic Act 14 in honor of Manuel L. Quezon.
 September 30 – The Amended Tenancy Act is promulgated.

Holidays

As per Act No. 2711 section 29, issued on March 10, 1917, any legal holiday of fixed date falls on Sunday, the next succeeding day shall be observed as legal holiday. Sundays are also considered legal religious holidays. Bonifacio Day was added through Philippine Legislature Act No. 2946. It was signed by then-Governor General Francis Burton Harrison in 1921. On October 28, 1931, the Act No. 3827 was approved declaring the last Sunday of August as National Heroes Day.

 January 1 – New Year's Day
 February 22 – Legal Holiday
 April 18 – Maundy Thursday
 April 19 – Good Friday
 May 1 – Labor Day
 July 4 – Philippine Republic Day
 August 13  – Legal Holiday
 August 25 – National Heroes Day
 November 28 – Thanksgiving Day
 November 30 – Bonifacio Day
 December 25 – Christmas Day
 December 30 – Legal Holiday

Births
 January 9 – Arthur Tugade, businessman, lawyer, and Secretary of Transportation
 January 20: 
Dong Puno, Lawyer, columnist, TV host
Lito Calzado - Filipino actor, director, and choreographer (d. 2011)
 February 19 - Alvarez Isnaji, Filipino politician
 February 22 - Butch Albarracin
 March 5 - Soledad Reyes, distinguished and recognized Philippine literature scholar, literary and art critic, author, anthologist, consultant, professor, instructor, editor, annotator, researcher, and essayist.
 March 8 - Robert Jaworski, Basketball player, Politician 
 March 17 - Leandro Mendoza, Filipino politician (d. 2013)
 April - Jaime de los Santos, retired military general in the Philippines.
 April 13 - Antonio del Rosario, Filipino politician
 April 15 - Roberto Roxas, former Filipino cyclist
 May 18 - Ameril Umbra Kato, founder of the Bangsamoro Islamic Freedom Fighters (d. 2015)
 May 19 - Victor Sumulong, Politician (d. 2009)
 May 23 - Dado Banatao, Filipino entrepreneur and engineer working in the high-tech industry. 
 June 26 - Orlando S. Mercado, Politician
 June 27 - Jose Miguel Arroyo, former First Gentleman of the Philippines.
 July 2 - Monico Puentevella, Politician
 July 4 – Roy Cimatu, Secretary of Environment and Natural Resources
 July 14 - Manuel V. Pangilinan, Filipino businessman.
 July 16 - Mel Chionglo, film director and production designer (d. 2019)
 July 19 -
Diosdado Banatao, Filipino entrepreneur and engineer working in the high-tech industry.
Roberto Pagdanganan, Filipino politician.
 July 22 - Rolando Joven Tria Tirona, Archbishop of Caceres
 July 25 - Bayani Fernando, former Chairman of the Metropolitan Manila Development Authority (MMDA).
 August 5 - Dante Rivero, Filipino actor
 August 8 - Snaffu Rigor, Filipino composer and vocalist.
 September 6 - Mandy Saguin
 September 8 – Ruel Vernal, Filipino actor
 October 2 - Khryss Adalia, Filipino film, television, and stage director, writer, and actor (d. 2008)
 October 5 - Pacita Abad, Painter (d. 2004)
 October 6 - Eddie Villanueva, Religious/spiritual and political leader
 October 10 - Mauricio Domogan, Filipino politician
 October 12 - Edward Hagedorn, Filipino politician and former Mayor of Puerto Princesa City
 October 14 - Joey de Leon, Filipino comedian, actor, and television presenter
 October 16 -  Exequiel Javier, Filipino politician
 October 31 - Helen Vela, Filipino actress and radio/TV personality (d. 1992)
 November 5 - Ariel Ureta, Filipino comedian, actor, and TV host
 November 10 - Reynaldo Wycoco, Director of National Bureau of Investigation
 November 15 - Raffy Marcelo, Veteran Broadcaster
 November 18 - Cornelio Padilla, former Filipino cyclist
 November 19 - Ramon Tulfo, TV host, radio broadcaster, and columnist
 December 29 -
 Arturo Brion, Associate Justice of the Supreme Court of the Philippines.
 Wilhelmino Sy-Alvarado, Governor of the Philippine province of Bulacan.

Unknown
Adolovni Acosta, Philippine-born classical pianist.
Teo Antonio, Filipino poet
Lito Banayo, Filipino politician

Deaths
 July 20 - Gil Montilla, Filipino politician (born 1876)

Unknown
 Benigno Ramos, author, writer,  organization founder, politician (born 1893)
 Isidro Ancheta, Filipino landscape painter (born 1882)

References